The Embassy of Nepal in London is the diplomatic mission of Nepal in the United Kingdom.

The building was erected in 1863-65 for Samuel Morton Peto by the architect James Murray and is a Grade II listed building. In 2013 there were rumours that the Nepali government were looking to sell the embassy for an anticipated £100 million, citing the huge cost of essential repair work; this caused outrage amongst the Nepali community in Britain.

Gallery

References

External links
Official site

Nepal
Diplomatic missions of Nepal
Nepal–United Kingdom relations
Buildings and structures in the Royal Borough of Kensington and Chelsea
Holland Park